Bee Hive, also spelled Beehive, is an unincorporated community in Lee County, Alabama, United States. It is part of the Columbus, Georgia-Alabama Metropolitan Area. Originally named for an apiary located along Wire Road near the Macon County line, the Bee Hive community today lies near the southwest periphery of the city limits of Auburn.It is the birthplace of James D. Edmondson. A post office operated under the name Beehive from 1896 to 1902.

References

Neighborhoods in Alabama
Populated places in Lee County, Alabama
Columbus metropolitan area, Georgia